Justin Rodhe (born October 17, 1984) is an American born Canadian shot putter.

Born in Bainbridge, Ohio, Rodhe moved to Canada in 2008 and became a Canadian citizen on November 1, 2011. The change of citizenship made him ineligible for the 2012 world indoor track and field championships and jeopardized his chance of competing for Canada at the 2012 Summer Olympics. An International Association of Athletics Federations rule requires an athlete be a citizen for two years before representing a country internationally; this would have made him ineligible until 2013, but an appeal by Athletics Canada was successful, and he competed in the shot put event for Canada; throwing three foot fouls.

Achievements
 Lawrence Meeting, Kansas City – third place (April 18, 2012)
 Personal best: 21.29 metres (bettered only by three other athletes so far in the 2013 IAAF season)

References

External links
 

1984 births
Living people
Athletes (track and field) at the 2012 Summer Olympics
Canadian male shot putters
Olympic track and field athletes of Canada
Sportspeople from Ohio
Commonwealth Games competitors for Canada
Athletes (track and field) at the 2014 Commonwealth Games
American sportsmen
People from Bainbridge, Geauga County, Ohio